Waldo County is a county in the state of Maine, in the United States.  As of the 2020 census, the population was 39,607.  Its county seat is Belfast. The county was founded on February 7, 1827 from a portion of Hancock County and named after Brigadier-General Samuel Waldo, proprietor of the Waldo Patent.

Geography

Adjacent counties
 Penobscot County – northeast
 Hancock County – east
 Knox County – south
 Lincoln County – southwest
 Kennebec County – west
 Somerset County – northwest

National protected area
 Carlton Pond Waterfowl Production Area

Demographics

2000 census
As of the census of 2000, there were 36,280 people, 14,726 households, and 10,057 families living in the county. The population density was 50 people per square mile (19/km2). There were 18,904 housing units at an average density of 26 per square mile (10/km2).  The racial makeup of the county was 97.89% White, 0.19% Black or African American, 0.40% Native American, 0.21% Asian, 0.01% Pacific Islander, 0.16% from other races, and 1.15% from two or more races.  0.59% of the population were Hispanic or Latino of any race. 24.8% were of English, 14.7% United States or American, 12.7% Irish, 8.5% French and 5.6% German ancestry. 97.1% spoke English and 1.5% French as their first language.

There were 14,726 households, out of which 30.70% had children under the age of 18 living with them, 55.20% were married couples living together, 9.00% had a female householder with no husband present, and 31.70% were non-families. 24.90% of all households were made up of individuals, and 9.60% had someone living alone who was 65 years of age or older.  The average household size was 2.43 and the average family size was 2.88.

In the county, the population was spread out, with 24.20% under the age of 18, 7.50% from 18 to 24, 27.80% from 25 to 44, 26.80% from 45 to 64, and 13.60% who were 65 years of age or older.  The median age was 39 years. For every 100 females there were 96.60 males.  For every 100 females age 18 and over, there were 93.80 males.

The median income for a household in the county was $33,986, and the median income for a family was $40,402. Males had a median income of $29,644 versus $23,816 for females. The per capita income for the county was $17,438.  About 10.90% of families and 13.90% of the population were below the poverty line, including 18.60% of those under age 18 and 12.20% of those age 65 or over.

2010 census
As of the 2010 United States census, there were 38,786 people, 16,431 households, and 10,627 families living in the county. The racial makeup of the county was 97.1% white, 0.4% Asian, 0.4% American Indian, 0.4% black or African American, 0.2% from other races, and 1.4% from two or more races. Those of Hispanic or Latino origin made up 0.9% of the population. In terms of ancestry, 26.3% were English, 21.0% were Irish, 19.0% were French, 9.2% American, 7.0% Scottish, 6.6% Italian, 2.7% Polish, and 2.2% Scotch-Irish.

Of the 16,431 households, 27.7% had children under the age of 18 living with them, 50.0% were married couples living together, 9.9% had a female householder with no husband present, 35.3% were non-families, and 27.7% of all households were made up of individuals. The average household size was 2.33 and the average family size was 2.81. The median age was 44.1 years.

The county's median household income was $41,312 and the median family income was $50,222. Males had a median income of $38,960 versus $30,321 for females. The county's per capita income was $22,213. About 10.2% of families and 14.6% of the population were below the poverty line, including 20.9% of those under age 18 and 11.6% of those age 65 or over.

Politics
Prior to the late 20th century, Waldo County was a solidly Republican county, going for Democrats only once between 1920 and 1988.  It was one of the counties that voted for Ross Perot in 1992. In each election of the 21st century, Waldo County was won by a Democrat, but never with more than 55% of the vote.

|}

Communities

City
 Belfast (county seat)

Towns

 Belmont
 Brooks
 Burnham
 Frankfort
 Freedom
 Islesboro
 Jackson
 Knox
 Liberty
 Lincolnville
 Monroe
 Montville
 Morrill
 Northport
 Palermo
 Prospect
 Searsmont
 Searsport
 Stockton Springs
 Swanville
 Thorndike
 Troy
 Unity
 Waldo
 Winterport

Census-designated places
 Searsport
 Unity
 Winterport

Other unincorporated villages
 East Thorndike
 East Troy
 Sandy Point

Cultural references
Waldo County features in Nathaniel Hawthorne's classic novel The House of the Seven Gables as the site of extensive landholdings once claimed by the formerly aristocratic Pyncheon family.

See also
 National Register of Historic Places listings in Waldo County, Maine

References

External links
 Official Website of Waldo County
 Maine Genealogy: Waldo County, Maine

 
Maine counties
1827 establishments in Maine
Populated places established in 1827